Alessandro Pezzatini (born 25 August 1957 in Fiesole, Province of Florence) is a retired male race walker from Italy.

Biography
He set his personal best on the 20 km walk in 1984 with a time of 1:20.18 (the time is still the best performance Italian 7th all-time), obtaining the qualification for the Olympic Games in Los Angeles where, however, he could not repeat that time and was ranked 28th with a time of 12.1 minutes over that.

Achievements

See also
 Italian all-time lists - 20 km walk

References

External links
 

1957 births
Living people
People from Fiesole
Italian male racewalkers
Athletics competitors of Fiamme Gialle
Athletes (track and field) at the 1984 Summer Olympics
Olympic athletes of Italy
World Athletics Championships athletes for Italy
Sportspeople from the Metropolitan City of Florence
20th-century Italian people